The Palau Soccer League is the highest division of competitive association football in the nation of Palau, founded in 2004 by the Palau Soccer Association. Due to the lack of equipment and facilities, all matches are played in the Palau Track And Field Stadium outside the town of Koror, on Koror island.

Champions	
A complete list of previous league champions:	
	
2004: Daewoo Ngatpang	
2005: Team Bangladesh	
2006: Surangel And Sons Company		
2006–07: Team Bangladesh (2)	
2008: Kramers
2009: Melekeok	
2010: Daewoo Ngatpang (2)
2012 Spring: Team Bangladesh (3)
2012 Fall: Taj FC	
2014: Kramers

Clubs by number of titles

Top scorers

References

 
1
Top level football leagues in Oceania